Xu Yuhua (born 29 October 1976) is a Chinese chess grandmaster and former Women's World Champion (2006–2008). She was China's third women's world chess champion after Xie Jun and Zhu Chen. She has been followed by Chinese women's world chess champions Hou Yifan, Tan Zhongyi, and Ju Wenjun.

Biography
On March 25, 2006 Yuhua won the Women's World Chess Championship knock-out tournament in Ekaterinburg, Russia, defeating Russian IM Alisa Galliamova in the final 2½–½ (in a best-of-four match). The knockout event had 64 participants, with both former world champion Zhu Chen and reigning world champion Antoaneta Stefanova. She became China's 22nd Grandmaster by winning the event. 

She lost her world championship at the following championship in 2008, which was also a 64-player knockout tournament, when she was knocked out in the second round. She won one of the Grand Prix tournaments in the FIDE Women's Grand Prix 2009–2011, but overall finished seventh, so did not qualify for the 2011 Women's World Championship match.

In 2011, Yuhua was playing for Zhejiang chess club in the China Chess League (CCL). As of 2021, she has played no FIDE-rated games since 2011.

Achievements
Major successes and titles include:

Winner of Zonal tournament (1993, 2001)
Asian junior girls' champion (1996)
Asian women's champion (1998)
Women's World Cup winner (2000, 2002)
Winner of the Chess Olympiads of 2000, 2002 and 2004
World women's champion (2006–2008)

Education

She is a law graduate.

Education degrees include: 
Master of Literature, Chinese Linguistics, Peking University, 2011
Bachelor of Law, Jurisprudence, Peking University, 2004

See also
Chess in China

References

External links
Official blog

Interview with Xu Yuhua ChessBase. 27 July 2008. Retrieved 7 November 2015

1976 births
Living people
Women's world chess champions
Chess grandmasters
Female chess grandmasters
Chess woman grandmasters
Chinese female chess players
People from Jinhua
Chess players from Zhejiang